Zhou Wenjun (born July 1, 1986, in Tangshan) is a Paralympian athlete from China competing mainly in category T38 sprint events.

He competed in the 2004 Summer Paralympics in Athens, Greece.  There he won a silver medal in the men's 100 metres – T38 event, a silver medal in the men's 4 x 100 metre relay – T35-38 event, a silver medal in the men's 4 x 400 metre relay – T35-38 event, a bronze medal in the men's 200 metres – T38 event and went out in the first round of the men's 400 metres – T38 event.  He also competed at the 2008 Summer Paralympics in Beijing, China., a silver medal in the men's 100 metres – T38 event, a silver medal in the men's 200 metres – T38 event, a silver medal in the men's 4 x 100 metre relay – T35-38 event and finished seventh in the men's 400 metres – T38 event

External links
 

Paralympic athletes of China
Athletes (track and field) at the 2004 Summer Paralympics
Athletes (track and field) at the 2008 Summer Paralympics
Athletes (track and field) at the 2012 Summer Paralympics
Paralympic silver medalists for China
Paralympic bronze medalists for China
Chinese male sprinters
1986 births
Living people
Sportspeople from Tangshan
Medalists at the 2004 Summer Paralympics
Medalists at the 2008 Summer Paralympics
Medalists at the 2012 Summer Paralympics
Paralympic medalists in athletics (track and field)
Medalists at the 2010 Asian Para Games
Paralympic sprinters